Chieve is a comune (municipality) in the Province of Cremona in the Italian region Lombardy, located about  southeast of Milan and about  northwest of Cremona.

Chieve borders the following municipalities: Abbadia Cerreto, Bagnolo Cremasco, Capergnanica, Casaletto Ceredano, Crema, Crespiatica.

References

Cities and towns in Lombardy